Avtandil Gogolishvili (born 26 January 1964) is a Georgian wrestler. He competed in the men's freestyle 82 kg at the 1996 Summer Olympics.

References

External links
 

1964 births
Living people
Male sport wrestlers from Georgia (country)
Olympic wrestlers of Georgia (country)
Wrestlers at the 1996 Summer Olympics
People from Guria